The Annals of Clinical & Laboratory Science is a quarterly academic journal. It is the official journal of, and is published by, the Association of Clinical Scientists. It was established in 1971 as Annals of Clinical Laboratory Science by F. William Sunderman and obtained its current title in 1973. As of 2022, the editor-in-chief is Nina Tatevian.

Abstracting and indexing
The journal is abstracted and indexed in:

According to the Journal Citation Reports, the journal has a 2013 impact factor of 0.839, ranking it 24th out of 31 journals in the category "Medical Laboratory Technology".

References

External links

Association of Clinical Scientists

Laboratory medicine journals
Publications established in 1973